Dafydd Jones or Dewi Dywyll (1803 – 1868) was a Welsh balladeer. His father was a carpenter in Llanybydder, Carmarthenshire, and he was born on the estate of Dolau Bach there. He was also known as Deio'r Cantwr (Davy the Singer) and Dewi Medi (Harvest Dave). Dafydd Jones gained the name Dewi Dywyll, which means Blind Davy, due to being blinded by accident. He wrote ballads and sang them.

He gained his fame for his impromptu singing all over Wales in an age of wandering balladeers who were popular characters. He wrote about 60 ballads — at least 70 according to the National Library of Wales.

He died at Lampeter in 1868.

Examples of his work

References

Welsh-language poets
Welsh singer-songwriters
Ballad musicians
Blind musicians
Blind writers
People from Carmarthenshire
1803 births
1868 deaths
19th-century Welsh male singers